Arnold is a masculine German, Dutch and English given name.
It is composed of the Germanic elements arn "eagle" and wald "power, brightness". The name is first recorded in Francia from about the 7th century, at first often conflated with the name Arnulf, as in the name of bishop Arnulf of Metz, also recorded as Arnoald. Arnulf appears to be the older name (with cognates in Anglo-Saxon and Old Norse), and German (Frankish) Arnold may have originally arisen in c. the 7th century as a corruption of Arnulf, possibly by conflation of similar names such as Hari-wald, Arn-hald, etc.

The name is attested with some frequency in Medieval Germany during the 8th to 11th centuries, as Arnold, Arnalt, Arnald, Arnolt. It was occasionally spelled Harnold, Harnald, and the name may have been conflated with an independent formation containing hari- "host, army". Its etymology ceased to be evident from an early time, and it was sometimes folk-etymologized as Ehrenhold in the early modern period.
The French form Arnaud is recorded from the 10th century, and may have reinforced and been reinforced by cognates in England after the Norman conquest, such as the Anglo-Saxon form Earnweald (Doomsday Book Ernehale; Ernaldus 12th century). However, the Norman spelling did not survive into the modern period (other than a possible survival in surnames such as Arnall, Arnell, although these names could be of multiple origins, most likely the Old English), and once standardised spelling swept England, the form Arnold gradually became the norm. In most of the English speaking world, the name regained popularity in the 18th and 19th centuries.
In the United States, Arnold had a relative surge of popularity at the beginning of the 20th century, peaking as the 89th most commonly given masculine name in 1916, but it dropped again below rank 200 by the 1950s.

Hypocorisms of the name are:  Arent (Arend, Ahrend), Arndt, Arne, Aarne, Aart (etc.).
Regional variants of the name include:  French: Arnaud, Arnault,
Italian: Arnoldo, Dutch: Arnout, Arnoud, Croatian: Arnoldo, Portuguese: Arnoldo, Spanish: Arnaldo, Catalan: Arnau, Arnald.
The German name was also adopted in Old West Norse (14th century), as Arnaldr  (Icelandic: Arnaldur).

Arnold is also recorded as a surname (via a patronymic) from the early modern period. (Cornelius Arnold, b. 1711).

List of people called Arnold

Arnoald (d. 611?), Frankish Bishop of Metz
Arnold I (disambiguation)
Arnold I (1060–1135), Count of Looz
Arnold I (fl. 1119–1147), Count of Cleves
Arnold I (died 1197/1198), Bishop of Coria
Arnold I (1337–1409), Lord of Egmond
Arnold I, Count of Astarac
Arnold II (died 1146), Count of Looz
Arnold II of Isenburg (c. 1190 – 1259), Archbishop of Trier
Arnold, Lord of IJsselstein (1304–1363), Dutch noble
Arnold of Arnoldsweiler, German saint
Arnold of Bergen (died 1434), Norwegian Roman Catholic bishop
Arnold of Brescia (c. 1090–1155), Italian Augustinian monk
Arnold of Egmond (1410–1473), Duke of Guelders
Arnold of Lübeck (died 1211~1214), German Benedictine priest and chronicler
Arnold of Metz (died 640), Frankish bishop of Metz
John Arnold of Monmouthshire (c. 1635–1702), Welsh Protestant politician
Saint Arnulf or Arnold of Soissons (died 1087), patron saint of brewers
Arnold of Torroja (died 1184), Spanish knight, Grand Master of the Knights Templar
Arnold von Uissigheim (died 1336), German highwayman, bandit, and renegade knight
Arnold Akberg (1894–1984), Estonian painter
Arnold Alas (1911–1990), Estonian landscape architect
 Arnoldo Aleman, Nicaraguan politician who served as the 81st president of Nicaragua 
Arnaud Amalric (died 1225), French Cistercian abbot
Arnaud Amanieu (1338–1401), Lord of Albret
Arnold Anderson (disambiguation)
Arnold Anderson (1912–1996), New Zealand sprinter and hurdler
Arnold Anderson, Native American chemical engineer
Arnold Arbeit (1911–1974), American artist and architect
Arnold Auerbach (disambiguation)
Arnold M. Auerbach (1912–1998), American comedy writer
Arnold "Red" Auerbach (1917–2006). American basketball coach
H. Arnold Barton (1929–2016), American historian
Arnold Bax (1883–1953), English composer, poet, and author
Arnold Orville Beckman (1900–2004), American chemist, inventor, investor, and philanthropist
Arnold Belgardt (1937–2015), Soviet Russian cyclist
Arnold Bennett (1867–1931), English writer
Arnold Böcklin (1827–1901), Swiss painter
Arnold Boonen (1669–1729), Dutch portrait painter
Arnold Børud (born 1947), Norwegian singer
Arnold Franz Brasz (1888–1966), American painter, sculptor, and printmaker
Arnold Bronckorst (fl. 1565–1583), Dutch painter
Arnold Brown (disambiguation)
Arnold Brown (1894–1960), Australian army officer
Arnold Brown (1913–2002), 11th General of The Salvation Army
Arnold Brown (1927–1994), Canadian politician
Stewart Arnold Brown (Arnie Brown; 1942–2019), Canadian ice hockey player
Arnold Brown, Scottish entertainer
Arnold von Bruck (c. 1500 – 1554), Franco-Flemish composer
Arnold W. Brunner (1857–1925), American architect
Arnold Bürkli (1833–1894), Swiss engineer
Arnold Büscher (1899–1949), German SS concentration camp commandant executed for war crimes 
Arnold Chernushevich (1933–1991), Soviet Belarusian fencer
Arnold Clark (1927–2017), Scottish businessman
Arnold Clavio (born 1965), Filipino journalist, newscaster, and television host
Arnaud Démare (born 1991), French cyclist
Arnold Denker (1914–2005), American chess player
Arnold Ebiketie (born 1999), American football player
Arnold Förster (1810–1884), German entomologist
Arnold Fothergill (1854–1932), English cricketer
Arnold Freeman (1886–1972), British writer, philosopher and anthroposophist
Arnold Frick (born 1966), Liechtenstein judoka
Arnold van Gennep (1873–1957), Dutch-French ethnographer and folklorist
Arnold Green (disambiguation)
Arnold Green (1920–2011), Estonian Soviet politician
Arnold Green (1932/1933–2016), New Zealand rugby league player
Arnold H. Green (1940–2019), American historian
Arnold Greenberg (disambiguation)
Arnold Greenberg (1932–2012), American businessman
Arnold Greenberg, American businessman
Arnold Henry Guyot (1807–1884), Swiss-American geologist and geographer
Arnold Hauser (1892–1978), Hungarian art historian
Arnold Heertje (1934–2020), Dutch economist
Arnold Wienholt Hodson (1881–1944), British colonial administrator
Arnold Horween (1898–1985), American football player and coach
Arnold Issoko (born 1992), Congolese footballer
Arnold Jackson (disambiguation)
Arnold Jackson (1891–1972), British athlete, army officer and barrister
Arnold Jackson (1903–1971), English cricketer
Arnold Jackson (born 1977), American football player
Arnold Janssen (1837–1909), German-Dutch Roman Catholicpriest and missionary, a saint
Arnold Jürgensen (1910–1944), Nazi Germany military officer
Arnold Kanter (1945–2010), American politician
Arnold Keyserling (1922–2005), German philosopher and theologian
Arnold Kirke-Smith (1850–1927), English footballer
Arnold Klebs (1870–1943), Swiss-American microbiologist
Arnold Kohlschütter (1883–1969), German astronomer and astrophysicist
Arnold Koller (born 1933), Swiss politician
Arnold Kopelson (1935–2018), American film producer
Arnold Kramer (1882–1976), American folk artist
Arnold Krammer (1941–2018), American historian
Arnold Laasner (1906–1964), Estonian footballer
Arnold Lakhovsky (1880–1937), Ukrainian-Russian painter and sculptor
Arnold Lang (1855–1914), Swiss naturalist
Arnold Barry Latman (1936–2019), American baseball player
Arnold Lazarus (1932–2013), South African psychologist
Arnold Lechler (born 1991), German-Russian footballer
Arnold Leese (1878–1956), British fascist politician and veterinarian
Arnold J. Levine (born 1939), American molecular biologists
Arnold Luhaäär (1905–1965), Estonian weightlifter
Arnold Lunn (1888–1974), English skier, mountaineer and writer
Arnold Majewski (1892–1942), Finnish military hero of Polish descent
Arnold Manoff (1914–1965), American screenwriter
Arnold Maran, Scottish surgeon and writer
Arnold Mendelssohn (1855–1933), German composer
Arnold Meri (1919–2009), Soviet Estonian military officer
Arnold Mickens (born 1972), American football player
Arnold Mitt (born 1988), Estonian basketball player
Arnold Möller (1581–1655), German calligrapher
Arnold Mühren (born 1951), Dutch football player and manager
Arnold Murray (disambiguation)
Arnold Musto (1883–1977), British civil engineer
Arnold Newman (1918–2006), American photographer
Arnold Nordmeyer (1901–1989), New Zealand politician
Arnold Nötzli (1900–?), Swiss cyclist
Arnold Origi (born 1983), Kenyan footballer
Arnold Oss (born 1928), American ice hockey player
Arnold Östman (born 1939), Swedish conductor
Arnold Palacios (born 1955), Northern Mariana Islands politician
Arnold Palmer (1929–2016), American golfer
Arnold Paole (died c. 1726), Serbian outlaw, supposed vampire
Arnold Payne (disambiguation)
Arnold Payne (1897–1973), English cricketer
Arnold Payne (born 1972), Zimbabwean sprinter
Arnold Penther (1865–1931), Austrian naturalist
Arnold Pihlak (1902–1985), Estonian footballer
Arnold Pinnock (born 1967), British-Canadian author
Arnold Plant (1898–1978), British economist
Arnold Pomerans (1920–2005), German-born British translator
Arnold Lewis Raphel (1943–1988), American diplomat
Arnold E. Reif (1924–2018), American cancer researcher
Arnold S. Relman (1923–2014), American physician
Arnold Ridley (1896–1984), English playwright and actor
Arnold Rönnebeck (1885–1947), German-born American artist
Arnold Rosé (1863–1946), Romanian-Austrian violinist
Arnold Rothstein (1882–1928), American mob boss
Arnold Rüütel (born 1928), Estonian politician, President of Estonia
Arnold Savage (1358–1410), English politician, Speaker of the House of Commons
Arnold Savage II (ca. 1382–1420), English politician
Arnold Scaasi (1930–2015), Canadian fashion designer
Arnold Schoenberg (1874–1951), Austrian-American composer
Arnold Schönhage (born 1934), German mathematician and computer scientist
Arnold Schottländer (1854–1909), German chess player
Arnold Schwarzenegger (born 1947), Austrian-born American bodybuilder, actor and politician, Governor of California
Arnold S. Shapiro (1921–1962), American mathematician
Arnold Shapiro (born 1941), American television producer and writer
Arnold von Siemens (1853–1918), German telecommunications industrialist
Arnold Šimonek (born 1990), Slovak footballer
Arnold Sjöstrand (1903–1955), Swedish actor and film director
Arnold Smith (disambiguation)
Arnold Smith (1915–1994), Canadian diplomat
Arnold Snyder, American gambler and gambling author
Arnold Sommerfeld (1868–1951), German physicist
Arnold Sorina (born 1988), Vanuatuan runner
Arnold Spohr (1923–2010), Canadian ballet dancer, choreographer, and artistic director
Arnold Stang (1918–2009), American actor and comedian
Arnold Susi (1896–1968), Estonian lawyer and politician
Arnold Townend (1880–1968), British politician
Arnold Townsend (1912–1994), English cricketer
Arnold Toynbee (1852–1883), British economic historian
Arnold J. Toynbee (1889–1975), British historian and philosopher
Arnolds Ūdris (born 1968), Latvian cyclist
Arnold Vaide (1926–2011), Swedish runner and football coach
Arnold Viiding (1911–2006), Estonian shot putter and discus thrower
Arnold Volpe (1869–1940), Lithuanian-born American composer and conductor
Arnold Vosloo (born 1962), South African-born American actor
Arnold Walfisz (1892–1962), Polish mathematician
Arnold Weiss (1924–2010), German-born American intelligence officer and lawyer
Arnold Wesker (1932–2016), British dramatist
Arnold Williams (disambiguation)
Arnold Williams (1870–1929), Welsh-born New Zealand cricketer
Arnold Williams (1890–1958), British businessman and politician
Arnold Williams (1898–1970), American politician, Governor of Idaho
Arnold Muir Wilson (1857–1909), British solicitor and politician
Arnold Wilson (1884–1940), British politician and army officer
Arnold Wolfendale (1927–2020), British astronomer

Fictional characters 
Arnold, the dog featured on a jingle used throughout his early career by British DJ Tony Blackburn
Arnold, the pet dog of Turtle, a character in the television series Entourage
Arnold, a anthropomorphic pig in the British animated television series Kipper
Arnold, a gay character in the series Please Like Me 
Arnold, a character in the 2003 film Spy Kids 3-D: Game Over
Arnold John Flass, a character in the Batman universe
Arnold Jackson, a character in the NBC sitcom Diff'rent Strokes
Arnold Joseph, a character in the 1998 foreign independent film Smoke Signals
Arnold Layne, eponymous title of the 1967 debut single by Pink Floyd
Arnold McKinley, a character and firefighter genius in the children's animated television series, Fireman Sam
Arnold Perlstein, a character in The Magic School Bus and its revival, The Magic School Bus Rides Again
Arnold Poindexter, a character in the Revenge of the Nerds film series
Arnold Rimmer, a character in the television series Red Dwarf
Dr. Arnold Rosen, a neighbor who is friendly with Don and Megan Draper in Mad Men (season 6)
Arnold Shortman, the main character in Nickelodeon's Hey Arnold! media
Arnold Teague, a character in the 1990 sci-fi film Solar Crisis
Arnold Toht, a character in Raiders of the Lost Ark
Arnold Vinick, a character in the television drama The West Wing
Dr. Arnold Wayne, Betty Draper's psychiatrist in Mad Men (season 1)
Arnold Weber, a character from the HBO series Westworld (TV series)
Arnold Wesker, a villain known as Ventriloquist in the DC Comics Universe
Arnold von Winkelried, a fictional hero in Swiss folklore
Arnold Ziffel, a character in the television sitcom Green Acres

See also
Arnold (disambiguation)
Arnold (surname)
Arnaud (given name)
Arnaud (surname)
 Arnau (disambiguation)

References

Förstemann, Ernst (1900). Altdeutsches Namenbuch (3 ed.). Bonn: P. Hanstein, 114–118.

English-language masculine given names
English masculine given names
German masculine given names
Dutch masculine given names
Estonian masculine given names
Polish masculine given names